The men's 200 metres at the 1946 European Athletics Championships was held in Oslo, Norway, at Bislett Stadion on 24 August 1946.

Medalists

Results

Final
24 August

Semi-finals
24 August

Semi-final 1

Semi-final 2

Heats
24 August

Heat 1

Heat 2

Heat 3

Heat 4

Participation
According to an unofficial count, 22 athletes from 14 countries participated in the event.

 (2)
 (2)
 (1)
 (2)
 (1)
 (1)
 (2)
 (2)
 (1)
 (2)
 (1)
 (2)
 (2)
 (1)

References

200 metres
200 metres at the European Athletics Championships